Graciela Cánepa (Montevideo, Uruguay, July 28, 1948 - Asuncion, Paraguay, October 7, 2006) was an Uruguayan actress and television presenter.
She died on October 7, 2006, at age 58, in Asuncion, Paraguay, from cardiopulmonary arrest.

Filmography 
 2004, Cándida
 1998, El toque del oboe 
 1994, Miss Ameriguá 
 1987, Los corruptores

Television 
 Arriba País, 1998-2000
 El Trece Para Todos, 2000-2002
 De Todo, Un Poco, 2002-2003
 Shopping House TV, 2006
 La Chuchi, 2006
 La Hora de las compras
 Sombras en la Noche

Theatre 
 Auto de la compadecida
 Cuatro para Chejov
 El Burgués Gentilhombre
 El diario de Ana Frank
 El médico a palos
 Entre pitos y flautas
 Feliz día Papá
 La cenicienta
 La gotera
 La Piaf
 La vida que te di
 Los hermanos queridos
 Pluto
 Sueño de una noche de verano
 Caligula
 Todos en París conocen

References

External links

1948 births
2006 deaths